Nagasaki 1st district was a constituency of the House of Representatives in the Diet of Japan. Between 1947 and 1993 it elected five Representatives by single non-transferable vote. It was located in Nagasaki and, as of 1993, consisted of the cities of Nagasaki, Isahaya and Shimabara and the Nishisonogi, Kitatakaki, Minamitakaki, Kamiagata and Shimoagata counties.

Representatives for Nagasaki 1st district included home minister Ichirō Honda, construction minister Motoharu Baba, foreign minister Tadashi Kuranari, education minister Takeo Nishioka (president of the House of Councillors in the 2010s, LDP vice secretary-general Fumio Kyūma (defence minister in the 1990s and 2000s) and NFP co-founder Yoshiaki Takaki (education minister in the 2010s).

Summary of results during the 1955 party system

Elected Representatives

References 

Districts of the House of Representatives (Japan)